is a Paralympic athlete of Japan with a unilateral upper limb impairment who was a medalist in Athletics at the 2016 Summer Paralympics.

References

1994 births
Living people
Japanese female sprinters
Paralympic athletes of Japan
Paralympic bronze medalists for Japan
Paralympic medalists in athletics (track and field)
Athletes (track and field) at the 2016 Summer Paralympics
Medalists at the 2016 Summer Paralympics
21st-century Japanese women